Crassispira dysoni is a species of sea snail, a marine gastropod mollusk in the family Pseudomelatomidae.

Description
The length of the shell varies between 20 mm and 30 mm.

Distribution
This species occurs in the Caribbean Sea from Mexico to Colombia, in particular off Panama.

References

 Reeve, L. 1846. Monograph of the genus Pleurotoma Conchologia Iconica 1 pls. 34-40

External links
 Rosenberg G., Moretzsohn F. & García E. F. (2009). Gastropoda (Mollusca) of the Gulf of Mexico, Pp. 579–699 in Felder, D.L. and D.K. Camp (eds.), Gulf of Mexico–Origins, Waters, and Biota. Biodiversity. Texas A&M Press, College Station, Texas
 
 
 J. Espinosa et al. Nuevas species y nuevos registros de moluscos gasteropodos (Mollusca, Gastropoda) marinos de la region oriental de Cuba; Avicennia 21: 59-67, 2017

dysoni
Gastropods described in 1846